The fourth series of On the Buses originally aired between 27 November 1970 and 21 February 1971, beginning with "Nowhere to Go". The series was produced and directed by Stuart Allen and designed by Alan Hunter-Craig. All the episodes in this series were written by Ronald Chesney and Ronald Wolfe.

Cast
 Reg Varney as Stan Butler
 Bob Grant as Jack Harper
 Anna Karen as Olive Rudge
 Doris Hare as Mabel "Mum" Butler
 Stephen Lewis as Inspector Cyril "Blakey" Blake
 Michael Robbins as Arthur Rudge

Episodes

{|class="wikitable plainrowheaders" style="width:100%; margin:auto;"
|-
! scope="col" style="background:#9F2828;color:white;" | Episode No.
! scope="col" style="background:#9F2828;color:white;" | Series No.
! scope="col" style="background:#9F2828;color:white;" | Title
! scope="col" style="background:#9F2828;color:white;" | Written by
! scope="col" style="background:#9F2828;color:white;" | Original air date

|}

See also
 1970 in British television
 1971 in British television

References

External links
Series 4 at the Internet Movie Database

On the Buses
1970 British television seasons
1971 British television seasons